Hyphilaria parthenis is a butterfly of the family Riodinidae. It is found in low altitude areas of the Neotropical realm, from Panama to southern Brazil.

The wingspan is about 25 mm. There is sexual dimorphism. Males have an orange base colour, while the base colour for females is white.

External links
Tolweb

Riodininae
Butterflies described in 1851
Riodinidae of South America